The 1993–94 FIS Ski Jumping World Cup was the 15th World Cup season in ski jumping and the 4th official World Cup season in ski flying. It began in Planica, Slovenia on 11 December 1993 and finished in Thunder Bay, Canada on 27 March 1994. The individual World Cup was won by Espen Bredesen and Nations Cup by Norway.

Lower competitive circuit this season included the Continental Cup.

Map of world cup hosts 
All 14 locations which have been hosting world cup events for men this season. Events in Falun and Oslo cancelled. Planica hosted flying, large and normal hill events.

 Four Hills Tournament
 World Cup & Ski Flying World Championships
 Bohemia Tournament

Calendar

Men

Men's team

Standings

Overall

Ski Flying

Nations Cup

Four Hills Tournament

References 

World cup
World cup
FIS Ski Jumping World Cup